Southampton Baptist Church and Cemetery is a historic Baptist church and cemetery in Southampton, Bucks County, Pennsylvania. It was built in 1772, and substantially enlarged in 1814.  It is a two-story, stuccoed stone meeting house style building with a steep gable roof.  The property includes the church cemetery, which has burials for 24 veterans of the American Revolution.

It was added to the National Register of Historic Places in 1978.

References

External links
 
 
 
 Listing at Philadelphia Architects and Buildings

1772 establishments in Pennsylvania
Cemeteries in Bucks County, Pennsylvania
Churches on the National Register of Historic Places in Pennsylvania
Churches completed in 1814
Baptist cemeteries in the United States
Churches in Bucks County, Pennsylvania
National Register of Historic Places in Bucks County, Pennsylvania
Baptist churches in Pennsylvania